Steven Skrzybski (born 18 November 1992) is a German professional footballer who plays as a striker for Holstein Kiel.

Early career
Born in the capital Berlin, Skrzybski began playing at youth level from a very young age. He started at just eight years old with local team SG Stern Kaulsdorf before quickly being spotted as a potential star by professional club Union Berlin.

Union Berlin
Skrzybski played 143 official games for Union from 2010 to 2018. Having risen through the various youth ranks at the club, he broke into the reserve team and was also considered to be first team quality. After mostly playing with the reserves for a few years the striker began life at full professional level and made a name for himself in the 2016–17 season, when he played in 32 matches and scored 9 times. He scored 14 goals in the 2017–18 season.

Schalke 04 
On 29 May 2018, Schalke announced that Skrzybski signed for the club on a three-year deal. On 24 November 2018, he scored his first two goals for Schalke against 1. FC Nürnberg in a 5–2 victory.

On 3 January 2020, Skrzybski was loaned out to Fortuna Düsseldorf for the rest of the 2019–20 season.

Holstein Kiel 
On 5 July 2021, Skrzybski signed for Holstein Kiel.

Personal life
Skrzybski is of distant Polish descent.

Career statistics

References

External links 
 
 

1992 births
Living people
German people of Polish descent
German footballers
Footballers from Berlin
Association football forwards
Bundesliga players
2. Bundesliga players
1. FC Union Berlin players
FC Schalke 04 players
Fortuna Düsseldorf players
Holstein Kiel players